Guitang an urban subdistrict and the seat of Yuhua District in Changsha City, Hunan Province, China. Located in the built-up area of the district, the subdistrict has borders with Dongjing Subdistrict to the south, Lituo and Dongshan Subdistricts to the east, Dongtundu Subdistrict of Furong District and Gaoqiao Subdistrict to the north, Yuhuating and Jingwanzi Subdistricts to the west.

References

Yuhua District, Changsha
Yuhua District